Taborio is a settlement on the island of Tarawa, Kiribati, where the Immaculate Heart College, a Catholic school, is situated. 

Taborio is situated on three and a half hectares of land surrounded by sea on all sides or reef-mud at low tide except where it is joined onto Nootoue village on its southern end.

References

Populated places in Kiribati